Seekers is a two-part TV mini-series released on ITV from 25 to 28 April 1993 about a private detective who disappears, and when his wife tries to find him, she discovers... another wife. They team up to search for him. It starred Brenda Fricker and Josette Simon, and was written by the celebrated novelist and screenwriter Lynda La Plante who also wrote the book of the same name.
It was produced by Sarah Lawson.

Selected Cast & Crew

Cast
Michael Carter - Mike Hazard 
Ken Bones -  Tony Laytham 
George Innes - Kenny Graham 
Andy Rashleigh - James Donald 
Harry Jones - Al Franks 
Brenda Fricker - Stella Hazard 
Josette Simon - Susie Hazard 
John Blakey - Kingston Officer 
Tina Martin - Nurse 
Graham Sinclair - D. I. Kent 
John Rowe -  Mr.Sidwick 
Dick Sullivan -  Priest

Crew
Director - Peter Barber-Fleming 
Writer - Lynda La Plante
Producer - Sarah Lawson
Composer - Daryl Runswick
Executive Producer - Ted Childs

See also

Lynda La Plante
Sarah Lawson
Ted Childs
Brenda Fricker
Josette Simon

References

External links

The Novel Version
La Plante Productions

1993 British television series debuts
1993 British television series endings
1990s British drama television series
Television series by ITV Studios
ITV comedy
ITV television dramas
1990s British television miniseries
English-language television shows
Television shows produced by Central Independent Television
Television shows set in England